Adolf Østbye (February 1868 – September 5, 1907) was a revue artist and barber who became the first Norwegian recording artist. The earliest playable Norwegian phonograph cylinder dates from 1889.

During the years 1889–1904, Østbye made a series of cylinders, announced "Østbye Record". Several of these are made with cooperation with the Norwegian Pathé manager, William Farre.

The first recording in Norway
In December 1904, Østbye was the first to make a gramophone record. The record was "Parodi paa Terje Vigen". (Actually, Edvard Grieg 1843–1907, was the first Norwegian to make gramophone records, he did nine records in Paris during the spring 1903.) 
The Norwegian recording sessions were held at the Grand Hotel, Kristiania.

Østbye recorded several cylinders and gramophone records. He mainly recorded for Pathé and The Gramophone Company (HMV) – whose masters were released as Victor records in the US, as well as Columbia cylinders and records. Many of these sold very well, and the most popular title "Bal i Hallingdal" together with Carl Mathisen (September 25, 1870 Holmsbu, Norway – 1933 Ray, North Dakota, US) at accordion remained in the HMV catalogues until the late 1930s.

Østbye also began to start up his own record company, "Ekko - Kristiania" during 1906–07. These plans were cut short by his illness in 1907. Only two Ekko records are reported to exist today. These records seem to be earlier Pathé and "Østbyes record"s that have been transferred. The reason for this might be that Østbye, at the time, was too ill to record "live". He died in Kristiania (Oslo), aged 39.

On several record labels, Østbyes last name has also been spelled: Östby(e), Østby(e) and Ostby(e).

1868 births
1907 deaths
Norwegian musicians